Camille Kovalev (née Mendoza; born 29 November 1994 in Toulouse) is a French pair skater. 

With Pavel Kovalev, she is the 2022 Grand Prix de France silver medalist, 2018 Volvo Open Cup silver medalist, 2015 International Cup of Nice bronze medalist, 2015 Lombardia Trophy bronze medalist, and 2022 French national champion.

Earlier in her career, she skated with Christopher Boyadji and competed in the final segment at the 2012 World Junior Championships.

She began learning to skate as a six-year-old.

Personal life 

Mendoza was born on 29 November 1994 in Toulouse, France. She married her skating partner, Pavel Kovalev, in December 2017 and subsequently adopted his last name.

Programs

With Pavel Kovalev

With Christopher Boyadji

Competitive highlights 
GP: Grand Prix; CS: Challenger Series; JGP: Junior Grand Prix

With Pavel Kovalev

With Boyadji

References

External links 

 
 

French female pair skaters
1994 births
Living people
Sportspeople from Toulouse